Nemapogon hispanica is a moth of the family Tineidae. It is found in Spain.

References

Moths described in 1992
Nemapogoninae